The Creeping Terror (a.k.a. The Crawling Monster) is a 1964 horror–science fiction film directed and produced by, and starring, Vic Savage. The plot is centered upon an extraterrestrial, slug-like creature that attacks and eats people whole in a small American town. Widely considered to be one of the worst films of all time, The Creeping Terror has become a cult film.

Plot
While driving along a highway in fictional Angel County in California, a sheriff's deputy, Martin Gordon (Vic Savage) and his wife Brett (Shannon O'Neil) meet Martin's uncle, sheriff Ben (Byrd Holland), and together they investigate a reported plane crash site. At the site, the group encounters the abandoned truck of a forest ranger, the ranger's hat, and an alien spacecraft that resembles a camping trailer; a large, slow-moving, slug-like creature had earlier emerged from the craft and departed prior to the group's arrival. Believing the absent ranger might be inside, Ben enters the craft by crawling underneath it. Shortly thereafter loud screams, along with growls like those of a lion, are heard from the craft, after which Martin radios for help.

In response to Martin's request for assistance, a "special unit" of military troops, commanded by Col. James Caldwell (John Caresio) and traveling in the back of a light-duty, civilian truck arrives at the site. Two of the troops enter the craft, examine its contents, and report back to Caldwell the presence inside of a large, tethered creature. The next day, "the world's leading authority on space emissions," Dr. Bradford (William Thourlby), arrives to direct the ongoing investigation, which includes an examination of the creature and the spacecraft's analog devices. As the investigation proceeds, the departed creature stalks the countryside and, despite its markedly awkward and slow pace of ambulation, successfully approaches, attacks, and eats a bikini-clad girl, a housewife hanging laundry, Grandpa Brown (Jack King) and his grandson Bobby (Pierre Kopp), picnickers at a "hootenanny" (one of whom attempts to stop the creature by swatting it with a guitar), numerous teenage couples, including a blonde girl in gold pants (Louise Lawson), at a community dance hall (at which time some attendees engage each other in fisticuffs), and couples in their cars at a lovers' lane (about which the film's narrator states that "anyone who experienced that catastrophe, and survived, would never go there again.")

Following the lover's lane incident, Caldwell orders his troops to attack the creature, telling Bradford that the creature would be captured alive if possible. This attack is accomplished by the troops standing close together, walking slowly toward the creature as a unit, and firing their small caliber firearms. The attack proves ineffective, however, and failing to retreat or otherwise walk away, all but two of the troops are devoured. Caldwell then decides to throw a live grenade, with the resultant explosion destroying the creature. After briefly examining the dead creature's tissue, Bradford hurriedly returns to the spacecraft and therein somehow triggers an explosion. Although this explosion mortally injures Bradford, it does not damage the craft or its instrumentation, and it allows the tethered creature to exit. As the creature prepares to devour Bradford, it is killed in a collision with Martin's arriving police car. Bradford then explains to Martin and Brett that the creatures were "mobile" laboratories designed to consume human beings, analyze the bodies chemically to detect weaknesses, and from the spacecraft transmit the acquired information into outer space. Although Martin fails to destroy the spacecraft's transmitter equipment, the dying Bradford says that the creatures' home planet might not even exist anymore, concluding that "only God knows for sure."

Cast

 Vic Savage as Martin Gordon
 Shannon O'Neil as Brett Gordon
 William Thourlby as Dr. Bradford
 John Caresio as Col. James Caldwell
 Brendon Boone as Barney the Deputy (credited as Norman Boone)
 Byrd Holland as Sheriff
 Jack King as Grandpa Brown
 Pierre Kopp as Bobby
 Louise Lawson as Blonde Girl in Gold Pants

Production
The Creeping Terror was directed, produced and edited by "Vic Savage" (an alias) under the name A. J. Nelson. Although Robert Silliphant is the credited writer, the original story was written by his younger brother Allan Silliphant (later known as Al Silliman Jr., and who would go on to write, produce, and direct the 1969 softcore comedy film The Stewardesses). Silliphant's other brother, Stirling, was at the time a successful writer, having written extensively for television shows that included Alfred Hitchcock Presents and Perry Mason, and he co-created Naked City and Route 66. Savage used this familial association to attract potential investors for the film: in exchange for receiving any of the film's profits, for a few hundred dollars Savage reportedly offered these investors a small part in the film.

When interviewed by director Pete Schuermann for The Creep Behind the Camera (aka Creep!) (2014), a docudrama film about the making of The Creeping Terror, Allan Silliphant claimed he was paid $1,500 by Savage. Following this payment, the then 21-year-old Silliphant returned three days later with the original nine-page film treatment that he had "made up" based only on an earlier, vague idea for the story. Later in the production, there was conflict between writer and director, with Silliphant frustrated that Savage did not share his vision that the story was intended to be outrageous. This conflict, and Silliphant's belief that the film would harm, rather than enhance, his family's reputation, especially that of his brother Stirling, ultimately led to his departure from the production.

Principal photography began in late 1962, but instead of shooting at scenic Lake Tahoe as Silliphant had expected, a muddy pond at Spahn Ranch in Simi Valley, California was used. When the film's special effects creator was not paid for his work, he allegedly stole the original creature costume a day prior to shooting, forcing Savage and his remaining crew to assemble a poorly constructed replica. In John Stanley's Revenge of the Creature Features Movie Guide (1988), the resultant creature is described as "...an elongated alien monster resembling a clumsy shag rug..." Because of Savage's difficulties in securing financing, filming was episodic and did not conclude until 1963.

There is minimal dialogue in the film, with nearly all vocalization provided in expository format by a narrator. This is because Savage either shot scenes without regard to the professional quality of the sound, the sound was improperly transferred (or not transferred at all, as a cost-saving measure) to 35mm mag stock, or the original soundtracks were lost. Having insufficient funds to pay for basic sound transfers or extensive post-production dubbing, Savage ultimately hired Larry Burrell, a radio news reader whose other film credits include They Saved Hitler's Brain and the nudie cutie Not Tonight Henry, to narrate the entire film. Although a minor amount of poor-quality re-dubbing was performed, the narrator speaks over most of the dialogue in the film, and long intervals devoid of dialogue have no narration, similar in style to many educational films produced in the 1950s and 1960s.

Savage might have checked into a motel with a silent picture-only Moviola to quickly assemble the finished film. Prior to the film's alleged release, however, Savage was repeatedly sued, and facing a possible indictment on charges of fraud, he vanished. Savage/Nelson/White was apparently never heard from again in the context of film production, and he reportedly died of liver failure in 1975, aged 41. In 2009, his wife Lois wrote a "tell-all" novel that featured her life with Savage, albeit using aliases.

Reception
With Savage having disappeared, the main financier, William Thourlby (who appeared in the film as Dr. Bradford), acquired the remaining film stock and had an edited version created in an attempt to recoup some of his investment. Sound reels for a later portion of the film had gone missing, so Thourlby added constant and occasionally intrusive narration. Some parts of the film he could not explain because of their lack of apparent narrative purpose, and the plot gets hazy.

Because The Creeping Terror would not be suitable for wide release and would, at best, have been relegated to drive-in theaters and second run showings, it was sold in 1976 as part of a syndication package of films for local television stations. In 1994, The Creeping Terror was featured in episode #606 of Mystery Science Theater 3000; the cast, crew and viewers of the program became noted critics of the film. TV Guide described The Creeping Terror as "pure camp," and claimed it might be the second-worst horror film ever made, behind only Plan 9 from Outer Space.

See also
 List of films considered the worst
List of films featuring extraterrestrials

References

Explanatory notes

Citations

General and cited references 
 Beaulieu, Trace. The Mystery Science Theater 3000 Amazing Colossal Episode Guide. New York: Bantam Books, 1996. .
 
 Medved, Harry and Michael Medved. Son of Golden Turkey Awards. New York: Random House/Villard Books, 1986. . 
 Smith, Michael and Eric Kasum. 100 of the Worst Ideas in History: Humanity's Thundering Brainstorms Turned Blundering Brain Farts. Chicago: Sourcebooks, 2014. .
 Stanley, John. Creature Features: The Science Fiction, Fantasy, and Horror Movie Guide. New York: Berkley Boulevard Books, 2000. .
 Wiseman, Lois A. Hollywood Con Man. Bloomington, Indiana: IUniverse, 2009. .

External links

 
 
 
 
 
 MST3K treatment on ShoutFactoryTV

1964 horror films
1964 films
American black-and-white films
1960s English-language films
Giant monster films
Crown International Pictures films
American science fiction horror films
Films about extraterrestrial life
American exploitation films
American monster movies
1960s monster movies
Films shot in Los Angeles County, California
1960s American films